

History 
The first issue of the Greensburg Daily News was published January 1, 1894 by Worrell Newspapers of Indiana. The independent Republican paper was printed every day except Sunday. Weekly editions of the paper included the Weekly News (1899-1901), Greensburg News (1901-1917) and Greensburg Standard (1918-1925). In 1918, the Greensburg Daily News absorbed the Greensburg Daily Review, a Republican paper created by Braden & Remy.

References

External links 
 Greensburg Daily News web site
 CNHI Website

Decatur County, Indiana
Newspapers published in Indiana
1894 establishments in Indiana
Publications established in 1894